Cy Robert Sneed (born October 1, 1992) is an American professional baseball pitcher for the Tokyo Yakult Swallows of the Nippon Professional Baseball league (NPB). He played in Major League Baseball (MLB) for the Houston Astros in 2019 and 2020.

Career

Amateur
Sneed attended Twin Falls High School in Twin Falls, Idaho. In 2011, his senior year, Sneed pitched to a 9–0 win–loss record with a 1.36 earned run average (ERA) with 130 strikeouts, and batted .467 with 11 home runs and 38 runs batted in. He led his team to win the Class 4A state championship. Sneed was named the Times-News Player of the Year, and the Gatorade Baseball Player of the Year for Idaho. 

The Texas Rangers selected Sneed in the 35th round of the 2011 MLB draft. He did not sign, opting to enroll at Dallas Baptist University to play NCAA baseball for the Dallas Baptist Patriots. He played with the Hyannis Harbor Hawks in the Cape Cod Baseball League in the summer of 2013. As a junior at Dallas Baptist in 2014, Sneed had an 8–3 win–loss record with a 3.55 ERA and 82 strikeouts in 104 innings pitched.

Milwaukee Brewers
The Milwaukee Brewers selected Sneed in the third round of the 2014 MLB draft, and he signed with the Brewers. After signing, he was assigned to the Helena Brewers where he pitched to an 0–2 record and 5.92 ERA in 11 games. Sneed spent the first half of the 2015 season with the Wisconsin Timber Rattlers, and after going 3–7 with a 2.68 ERA in 15 games (13 starts), was named a Midwest League All-Star. He spent the second half of the season with the Brevard County Manatees where he pitched to a 3–4 record and 2.47 ERA in 11 games started.

Houston Astros
On November 19, 2015, the Brewers traded Sneed to the Houston Astros for Jonathan Villar. He spent the 2016 season with the Corpus Christi Hooks where he posted a 6–5 record and 4.04 ERA in 25 games. In 2017, he pitched for both Corpus Christi and the Fresno Grizzlies, going a combined 10–6 with a 5.97 ERA and 1.59 WHIP in 26 total games (18 starts) between the two teams. He returned to Fresno in 2018. In 2019, Sneed opened the season with the Round Rock Express, and was named to the Pacific Coast League all-star team. He posted a 7–6 record with a 4.19 ERA over 81.2 innings for them.

On June 27, 2019, the Astros promoted Sneed to the major leagues. With Houston in 2019, Sneed posted a 0–1 record with a 5.48 ERA over  innings. In 2020 he was 0–3 with a 5.71 ERA in 18 relief appearances over  innings in which he struck out 21 batters.

Tokyo Yakult Swallows
On December 2, 2020, the Astros requested unconditional release waivers on Sneed so that he could sign with the Tokyo Yakult Swallows of Nippon Professional Baseball. He re-signed for the 2023 season.

Personal life
Sneed has an older brother, Zeb. They were born in Elko, Nevada. His father, a sergeant in the Nevada Highway Patrol, took a demotion to move the family to Twin Falls in 2007, because their high school had a stronger baseball team that Sneed and his brother could play for. Sneed is the third member of his family to be selected in the MLB draft; his father played college baseball but did not sign with a professional team, and his brother was drafted and played professionally.

Sneed and his wife, Hannah, were married in November 2014. An avid outdoorsman, he hunts and fishes.

References

External links

 Career statistics - NPB.jp

1992 births
Living people
People from Elko, Nevada
Baseball players from Nevada
Major League Baseball pitchers
Houston Astros players
Dallas Baptist Patriots baseball players
Hyannis Harbor Hawks players
Helena Brewers players
Wisconsin Timber Rattlers players
Brevard County Manatees players
Corpus Christi Hooks players
Fresno Grizzlies players
Round Rock Express players
Tokyo Yakult Swallows players